Chithirai Sevvaanam is a 2021 Indian Tamil-language  crime drama film directed by Silva, starring Samuthirakani and Pooja Kannan. Produced by A. L. Vijay's Think Big Studios, it was released on 3 December 2021 on ZEE5.

Cast 
Samuthirakani as Muthu Pandi
Pooja Kannan as Aishwarya
Manasvi Kottachi as young Aishwarya
Rima Kallingal as Aasha Nair
Vidya Pradeep as Lakshmi
Arvind Akash as Aasha's husband

Production 
The film marked the directorial debut of stuntman Stunt Silva, and the acting debut of Pooja Kannan, the sister of actress Sai Pallavi. Rima Kallingal made a return to Tamil films through the project after a ten year hiatus.

Silva was initially keen to debut with a comedy film but made Chithirai Sevvaanam at the request of his friend A. L. Vijay, who also wrote and produced the film.

Release 
The film was directly released on ZEE5 on 3 December 2021 and received mixed reviews. A critic from Sify.com called the film a "a decent watch for its core theme but the execution is average." In their review, the Times of India noted "Chithirai Sevvanam is a well intentioned movie that talks about the perils of technology and how women are easy targets. Loosely based on the Pollachi sexual harassment and extortion case, the movie does have its moments as it addresses the issue but fails largely due to the draggy melodrama". The NewsMinute called it "a well-intentioned but confused film on sexual violence".

References

External links 
 

2020s Tamil-language films
2021 films
Indian drama films
ZEE5 original films
2021 drama films
2021 directorial debut films
Films scored by Sam C. S.